Reverence is a sculpture in Vermont created by Jim Sardonis in 1989 that depicts two tails of whales "diving" into a sea of grass. It is meant to symbolize the fragility of the planet.

The sculpture was commissioned by British metals trader David Threlkeld, who was then a resident of Randolph, Vermont.  The tails were to be at the entrance to a conference center that Threlkeld was planning, but financing fell through and Threlkeld moved to Arizona.  After ten years at this Randolph site, they were sold and then moved to Technology Park in South Burlington where Ben & Jerry's ice cream has its corporate headquarters.

The Whale Tails, as the sculpture is more commonly known by local residents, is a landmark on the side of Interstate 89 between exits 12 and 13, notable partly because Vermont is a landlocked state. The sculpture has graced the covers of at least two books, Weird New England by Joseph A. Citro and the art history textbook A World of Art by Henry Sayre.

This sculpture is documented in the Smithsonian's Save Outdoor Sculpture! database. The sculpture was examined for Save Outdoor Sculpture! in 1992 while it was located along Interstate 89, west of exit 4, Randolph Center, Vermont.

Whales in Vermont
Fossils of marine invertebrates found in the Champlain Valley reveal that Vermont was underwater during the Paleozoic Era, more than 300 million years ago, long before the advent of mammals. In recent geologic history, the last glacier melted away about 12,500 years ago, and the sea poured in. This inland sea was inhabited by many of the animals that inhabit the North Atlantic today, including mollusks, sea urchins, squid, herring, cod, salmon, seals, and belugas. In 1849, while constructing a railroad, workmen uncovered the bones of a beluga whale in a swampy area in Charlotte, Vermont. The fossil beluga is housed in the Perkins Museum at the University of Vermont. By about 10,000 years ago, the Champlain Valley had risen above sea level. The valley's waters drained northward into the St. Lawrence River, a major waterway in Canada connecting the Great Lakes with the Atlantic Ocean.  Over 20 fossils of ancient beluga whales have been found around Lake Champlain.

The artist
Jim Sardonis is a jewelry maker as well.  Some of his jewelry is based on Reverence including rings depicting the two tail

Sardonis said about his work:

References

Business People Vermont
RoadsideAmerica.com
Aboutstone.org

External links
Reverence at Jim Sardonis' official site

1989 sculptures

South Burlington, Vermont
Granite sculptures in Vermont
Whales in art
1989 establishments in Vermont
Outdoor sculptures in Vermont
Animal sculptures in Vermont
Animal monuments